2014 was designated as:
International Year of Crystallography
International Year of Family Farming
International Year of Small Island Developing States
International Year of Solidarity with the Palestinian People



Events

January
 January 1
 Latvia officially adopts the euro as its currency and becomes the 18th member of the Eurozone.
 January 5 – A launch of the communication satellite GSAT-14 aboard the GSLV Mk.II D5 marks the first successful flight of an Indian cryogenic rocket engine.

February
 February – The West African Ebola virus epidemic begins, infecting at least 28,616 people and killing at least 11,310 people, the most severe both in terms of numbers of infections and casualties.
 February 7–23 – The XXII Olympic Winter Games are held in Sochi, Russia. Slopestyle events are introduced for the first time.
 February 13 – Belgium becomes the first country in the world to legalise euthanasia for terminally ill patients of any age.
 February 22 – Revolution of Dignity: The Verkhovna Rada (Ukrainian parliament) votes to remove President Viktor Yanukovych from office, replacing him with Oleksandr Turchynov, after days of civil unrest leaving around 100 people dead in Kyiv.
 February 28 – The number of people in the U.S. using mobile devices to access the internet overtook those using desktop computers for the first time, a feat which would be followed globally two years later in 2016.

March
 March 5 – Nicolás Maduro, the President of Venezuela, severs diplomatic and political ties with Panama, accusing Panama of being involved in a conspiracy against the Venezuelan government.
 March 8 – Malaysia Airlines Flight 370, a Boeing 777 airliner en route to Beijing from Kuala Lumpur, disappears over the Gulf of Thailand with 239 people on board. The aircraft is presumed to have crashed into the Indian Ocean.
 March 16 
 2014 Crimean status referendum: A disputed referendum on the status of the Crimean Peninsula is held.
 The fifth ICC T20 World Cup in cricket is held in Bangladesh.
 March 21 – Russia formally annexes Crimea after President Vladimir Putin signs a bill finalizing the process.
 March 24 – During an emergency meeting, the United Kingdom, the United States, Italy, Germany, France, Japan, and Canada temporarily suspend Russia from the G8, recognizing Crimea within Ukraine's international borders and rejecting the validity of the 2014 Crimean referendum.
 March 31 – The United Nations International Court of Justice rules that Japan's Antarctic whaling program is not scientific but commercial and forbids grants of further permits.

April
 April 7 – The self-proclaimed Donetsk People's Republic statelet unilaterally declares its independence from Ukraine.
 April 10 – In response to the invasion and subsequent annexation of Crimea by Russia, the Parliamentary Assembly of the Council of Europe (PACE) passes a resolution to temporarily strip Russia of its voting rights; its rights to be represented in the Bureau of the Assembly, the PACE Presidential Committee, and the PACE Standing Committee; and its right to participate in election-observation missions.
 April 14 – Chibok schoolgirls kidnapping: an estimated 276 girls and women are abducted from a school in Nigeria and held hostage.
 April 16 – The South Korean ferry MV Sewol capsizes and sinks after an unmanageable cargo shift, killing 304 people, mostly high school students.
 April 27 – The Catholic Church simultaneously canonizes Popes John XXIII and John Paul II.
 April 28 – United States President Barack Obama's new economic sanctions against Russia go into effect, targeting companies and individuals close to Russian President Vladimir Putin.

May
 May 5 
The World Health Organization identifies the spread of poliomyelitis in at least 10 countries as a major worldwide health emergency.
Boko Haram militants kill approximately 300 people in a night attack on Gamboru Ngala in Nigeria.
 May 6–10 – The Eurovision Song Contest 2014 takes place in Copenhagen, Denmark, and is won by Austrian entrant Conchita Wurst with the song "Rise Like a Phoenix".
 May 12 – The Luhansk People's Republic unilaterally declares its independence from Ukraine.
 May 14 – According to a South Korea Unification Ministry report, a twenty-three story apartment building collapsed in Pyongchon-guyok, Pyongyang, North Korea (DPR of Korea), with more than 490 fatalities estimated.     
 May 20 – 2014 Jos bombings: Terrorists in Nigeria detonate bombs at Jos, killing 118 people.
 May 22
2014 Thai coup d'état: The Royal Thai Army overthrows the caretaker government of Niwatthamrong Boonsongpaisan after a failure to resolve the political unrest in Thailand.
A terrorist attack in Ürümqi, China leaves 43 dead and more than 90 injured.
The Donetsk People's Republic and the Luhansk People's Republic declare the formation of Novorossiya, also referred to as the Union of People's Republics.
 May 26 – Narendra Modi succeeds Manmohan Singh as the 14th prime minister of India.

June
 June 5 – A Sunni militant group now calling itself the Islamic State of Iraq and the Levant (also known as ISIS, ISIL or Daesh) begins an offensive through northern Iraq, aiming to capture the Iraqi capital city of Baghdad and overthrow the Shiite government led by Prime Minister Nouri al-Maliki.
 June 12 – In the Camp Speicher massacre in Iraq, ISIL kills 1,566 Shia Iraqi Air Force cadets. It is the second deadliest terrorist attack in history and the deadliest attack conducted by ISIL.
 June 13 – International military intervention against ISIL begins.
 June 14 – The Catholic Church removes restrictions on clerical marriage in the Eastern Catholic Churches' diaspora.
June 15 - The San Antonio Spurs defeat the Miami Heat in the 2014 NBA Finals, 4–1, to win their 5th championship in franchise history. 
June 15 - Australia wins the 2014 Hockey World Cup.
 June 19 – Felipe VI becomes King of Spain upon the abdication of his father, Juan Carlos I.
 June 29 – The Islamic State of Iraq and the Levant declares itself a caliphate.

July
 July 8 – Brazil, hosts of the 2014 FIFA World Cup, are beaten 7–1 by Germany in the semi-finals.
 July 8–August 26 – Amid growing tensions between Israel and Hamas following the kidnapping and murder of three Israeli teenagers in June and the revenge killing of a Palestinian teenager in July, Israel launches Operation Protective Edge against Hamas-controlled Gaza Strip starting with numerous missile strikes, followed by a ground offensive a week later. In seven weeks of fighting, 2,100 Palestinians and 71 Israelis are killed. 
 July 13 - Germany wins the 2014 FIFA World Cup
 July 17 – Malaysia Airlines Flight 17, a Boeing 777, crashes in eastern Ukraine after being shot down by a missile. All 298 people on board are killed.
 July 21 – The United Nations Security Council adopts Resolution 2166 in response to the shootdown of Malaysia Airlines Flight 17.
 July 23–August 3 – The 2014 Commonwealth Games takes place in Glasgow, Scotland. 
 July 24 – Air Algérie Flight 5017, a McDonnell Douglas MD-83, crashes in Mali, killing all 116 people on board.
 July 28 – 100-year anniversary of World War I's commencement (Austria-Hungary declares war on Serbia).

August
 August 3 – Sinjar massacre, beginning of ISIS attacks resulting in massacre of over 4,000 Yazidis in Iraq's Sinjar District.
 August 7 – Khmer Rouge leaders Nuon Chea and Khieu Samphan are found guilty of crimes against humanity and are sentenced to life imprisonment by the Khmer Rouge Tribunal.
 August 8 – American-led intervention in Iraq: The United States military begins an air campaign in northern Iraq to stem the influx of ISIL militants.
 August 9 – The shooting of Michael Brown, an African American, by a police officer occurs in Ferguson, Missouri, triggering riots.

September
 September 18 – In the 2014 Scottish independence referendum, Scotland votes against independence from the United Kingdom.
 September 21 – The Battle of Sanaa leads to the start of the Yemeni Civil War, as Houthi forces capture the capital city Sanaa, followed by a rapid Houthi takeover of the government.
 September 22 – American-led intervention in Syria: The United States and several Arab partners begin their airstrike campaign in Syria.
 September 24 – The Mars Orbiter Mission, popularly known as Mangalyaan, which was launched on 5 November 2013 by the Indian Space Research Organisation, reached Martian orbit, making India the first Asian country to successfully reach Mars.
 September 26 – The 2014 World Summit of Nobel Peace Laureates, to be held in Cape Town from 13 to 15 October, is suspended after a boycott of Nobel Laureates to protest the third time refusal of a visa to the 14th Dalai Lama by a South African Government "kowtowing to China".
 September 28 – Hong Kong protests: Benny Tai Yiu-ting announces that Occupy Central is launched as Hong Kong's government headquarters is being occupied by thousands of protesters. Hong Kong police resort to tear gas to disperse protesters but thousands remain.

October
 October 3 – Stefan Löfven replaces Fredrik Reinfeldt as Prime Minister of Sweden.
 October 7 – The Pilot episode for Arrowverse show The Flash (2014 TV series) premiered, making it the second show in the Arrowverse
 October 19 – The Roman Catholic Church beatifies Pope Paul VI.
 October 20 – Joko Widodo is inaugurated as the 7th President of Indonesia.
 October 31 – Longtime Burkina Faso President Blaise Compaoré resigns after widespread protests in response to his attempts to abolish presidential term limits.

November
 November 2 – The Intergovernmental Panel on Climate Change (IPCC) releases the final part of its Fifth Assessment Report, warning that the world faces "severe, pervasive and irreversible" damage from global emissions of CO2.
 November 3 – The tallest building in the Western Hemisphere, One World Trade Center in New York City, opens.
 November 12 – The uncrewed Rosetta spacecraft's Philae probe successfully lands on Comet 67P, the first time in history that a spacecraft has landed on such an object.

December
 December 3 – The Japanese space agency, JAXA, launches uncrewed spaceprobe Hayabusa2 from the Tanegashima Space Center on a six-year round-trip mission to Ryugu to collect rock samples.
 December 15 – Two hostages and terrorist Man Haron Monis are killed in the Lindt Cafe siege in Sydney, Australia.
 December 16 – 2014 Peshawar school massacre: The Pakistani Taliban carry out a mass shooting at an army school in Peshawar, Pakistan, killing at least 145 people, mostly schoolchildren. 
 December 17 – U.S. President Barack Obama announces the resumption of normal diplomatic relations between the U.S. and Cuba.
 December 28 – Indonesia AirAsia Flight 8501 from Surabaya, Indonesia to Singapore crashes into the Java Sea just southwest of Borneo, killing all 162 people on board.

Births and Deaths

Nobel Prizes

 Chemistry – Eric Betzig, Stefan Hell and William E. Moerner
 Economics – Jean Tirole
 Literature – Patrick Modiano
 Peace – Kailash Satyarthi and Malala Yousafzai
 Physics – Isamu Akasaki, Hiroshi Amano and Shuji Nakamura
 Physiology or Medicine – John O'Keefe, May-Britt Moser and Edvard Moser

New English words
acute flaccid myelitis
aro
Black Lives Matter
gig worker
hard pass
initial coin offering/ICO
manspreading
on fleek
zoom

See also
List of international years

References